Bursfelde is a village, now administratively joined with Hemeln as Bursfelde-Hemeln, in the northern part of Hann. Münden in the district of Göttingen, Lower Saxony, Germany.

The village lies on the east side of the Weser River.  It is best known for its 
Bursfelde Abbey.

Villages in Lower Saxony
Bramwald